The Military Merit Medal is a military decoration of the Armed Forces of the Philippines.  The medal is awarded for heroic achievement or meritorious service during, or in support of military action against an enemy.

Criteria
Military personnel of the Armed Forces of the Philippines may be awarded the Military Merit Medal.  Criteria for award varies as it may be awarded "...for heroic achievement in combat or meritorious achievement for service not involving participation in combat, in connection with military operations against an enemy of the Philippines; for a single act of meritorious service either in a duty responsibility or in direct support of military operations."  The cited achievement or service is to be accomplished with distinction.

The Military Merit Medal may be awarded by the Chief of Staff of the Armed Forces of the Philippines, Area Commanders, and the Commanders of the Philippine Army, Philippine Navy, or Philippine Air Force. Division and major subordinate unit commanders, holding at least the rank of Brigadier General, may also award the medal.

The Military Merit Medal may be awarded posthumously to members of the Armed Forces of the Philippines.  Under these conditions eligible personnel are those who are killed in action by an enemy of the Philippines, while serving in any capacity with the armed forces, or as a direct result of an act of the enemy.

Description
The medal is irregular in shape, taking the form of a downward pointing equilateral triangle, enameled in red.  At each point of the triangle is a gold star. Superimposed in the center of the triangle is the "Philippines sun" in gold with eight pointed rays.  A green laurel wreath passes around and behind the triangle and is visible between each of the points.

The medal is suspended from a green ribbon with 3 central narrow red stripes.

See also
 Awards and decorations of the Armed Forces of the Philippines

References

Citations

Bibliography
 The AFP Adjutant General, AFP Awards and Decorations Handbook, 1995, 1997, OTAG.

Military awards and decorations of the Philippines